The CR400BF Fuxing is a Chinese electric high-speed train that was developed and manufactured by CRRC Changchun Railway Vehicles. Development on the project started in 2012, and the design plan was finished in September 2014. The first EMU rolled off the production line on 30 June 2015. The series received its current designation of Fuxing in June 2017, with the nickname Golden Phoenix.

Variants
It is manufactured by CRRC Changchun Railway Vehicles.
CR400BF–A 16-car version manufactured by CRRC Changchun Railway Vehicles. Testing of this variant started on March 9, 2018. The first CR400BF-A started operation of the Beijing–Shanghai high-speed railway on June 29, 2018.
CR400BF–B 17-car version. It is manufactured by CRRC Changchun Railway Vehicles.
CR400BF–C 8-car ATO enabled version with redesigned interior and exterior used on the Beijing–Zhangjiakou intercity railway in preparation for the 2022 Winter Olympics. It is manufactured by CRRC Changchun Railway Vehicles. The interior design incorporates snow and ice elements with blue ambient light. The train is also equipped with high-definition LED destination displays, wireless charging for business class seats, and smart glass windows. Additional features include snowboard storage and urine sampling areas. The trains are manufactured by CRRC Changchun Railway Vehicles. CR400BF–C started operating on December 30, 2019, with the opening of the Beijing–Zhangjiakou ICR.

CR400BF–G 8-car sandstorm and cold climate resistant version for use in more extreme weather. It is manufactured by CRRC Changchun Railway Vehicles. Shares same exterior style as the CR400BF.
CR400BF–Z 8-car variant with redesigned and upgraded interior and exterior. It is manufactured by CRRC Changchun Railway Vehicles.
CR400BF–BZ 17-car variant with redesigned and upgraded interior and exterior. It is manufactured by CRRC Changchun Railway Vehicles.
CR400BF–GZ 8-car sandstorm/cold resistant version with redesigned interior and exterior. It is manufactured by CRRC Changchun Railway Vehicles.

Specification

Gallery

See also 
 China Railway CR400AF
 China Railway High-speed, Chinese high-speed railway service provided by China Railway.
 China Railway, Chinese state-owned corporation that operates all Fuxing trains.
 Fuxing (train), the train brand CR400BF is part of.

References

High-speed trains of China
Electric multiple units of China
Passenger trains running at least at 350 km/h in commercial operations
CRRC multiple units
25 kV AC multiple units